World Club Championship may refer to:
 FIFA Club World Championship or FIFA Club World Cup, an association football event
 World Club Cup or Intercontinental Cup, the forerunner of the FIFA Club World Cup
 FIBA World Club Championship, an international basketball championship for clubs
 World Club Challenge or World Club Championship, a rugby league football event